Osa is an unincorporated community in the northeast corner of Barry County, in the U.S. state of Missouri. The community is on Missouri Route JJ 1.5 miles north of Revisville. Crane in adjacent Stone County is three miles to the east.

History
A post office called Osa was established in 1895, and remained in operation until 1908. The origin of the name Osa is obscure.

References

Unincorporated communities in Barry County, Missouri
Unincorporated communities in Missouri